Zeita was a town of ancient Anatolia in the borderlands between ancient Bithynia and Paphlagonia, inhabited in Roman times. The name does not occur among ancient authors but is inferred from epigraphic and other evidence.

Its site is located near Meydan, Asiatic Turkey.

References

Populated places in Bithynia
Populated places in ancient Paphlagonia
Former populated places in Turkey
Roman towns and cities in Turkey
History of Çankırı Province